Iazafo is a small river in the east of Madagascar.

Its mouth is in the Indian Ocean at the city of Mahambo in the region of Analanjirofo.

References

Rivers of Analanjirofo
Rivers of Madagascar